Mwanza International School is a primary school teaching the British National Curriculum to local and expatriate children in Mwanza, Tanzania.  The school was founded in 2012 by Barry and Ruth Clement and is situated on the Capri Point promontory overlooking the shores of Lake Victoria.

External links 

 http://www.mwanzainternational.org/ Mwanza International School

International schools in Tanzania
Private schools in Tanzania
Primary schools in Tanzania
Mwanza
Educational institutions established in 2012
2012 establishments in Tanzania
Buildings and structures in the Mwanza Region